Chuang Lai-chun (born 3 February 1961) is a Taiwanese luger. She competed in the women's singles event at the 1984 Winter Olympics.

References

1961 births
Living people
Taiwanese female lugers
Olympic lugers of Taiwan
Lugers at the 1984 Winter Olympics
Place of birth missing (living people)